The Evangelical Lutheran Church in Canada (ELCIC) is Canada's largest Lutheran denomination, with 95,000 baptized members in 519 congregations, with the second largest, the Lutheran Church–Canada, having 53,165 baptized members. Together with the LCC and the Canadian Association of Lutheran Congregations, it is one of only three all-Canadian Lutheran denominations. It is a member of the Lutheran World Federation, the Canadian Council of Churches, the World Council of Churches, and the Anglican-Lutheran North American grouping Churches Beyond Borders. According to the 2011 Canadian census, a larger number of 478,185 adherents identify as Lutheran.

History
The Evangelical Lutheran Church in Canada came into being in 1986 through the merger of two predecessor bodies the Evangelical Lutheran Church of Canada (started in 1966 by Canadian congregations of the American Lutheran Church) and three synods of the Lutheran Church in America, called the Canada Section. (In 1988 these two U.S. church bodies ceased to exist as they merged into the Evangelical Lutheran Church in America, the ELCIC's sister denomination in the United States.)

Constituting Convention
1985 Winnipeg, Manitoba

National Conventions
1987 Ottawa, Ontario
1989 Saskatoon, Saskatchewan
1991 Edmonton, Alberta
1993 Vancouver, British Columbia
1995 Winnipeg, Manitoba
1997 Toronto, Ontario
1999 Regina, Saskatchewan
2001 Waterloo, Ontario
2003 Camrose, Alberta
2005 Winnipeg, Manitoba
2007 Winnipeg, Manitoba
2009 Vancouver, British Columbia
2011 Saskatoon, Saskatchewan
2013 Ottawa, Ontario
2015 Edmonton, Alberta
2017 Winnipeg, Manitoba

Doctrine

The Church derives its teachings from the Bible and the Book of Concord which includes the three ecumenical creeds of the Christian Church—that is, the Apostles' Creed, the Nicene Creed and the Athanasian Creed. The Evangelical Lutheran Church in Canada is in full communion with the Anglican Church of Canada under the Waterloo Declaration.  Martin Luther University College and Lutheran Theological Seminary, Saskatoon are the seminaries owned by the church.

Organisation

The Evangelical Lutheran Church in Canada is composed of five geography-based synods (similar to a diocese in Anglican polity). The presiding officer and chief pastor of each synod is a bishop.
The British Columbia Synod
The Synod of Alberta and the Territories
 Robert Jacobson first bishop (1985–1995)
The Saskatchewan Synod
The Manitoba/Northwestern Ontario Synod
The Eastern Synod

This structure is identical to the synod structure of the ELCA, except that the Canadian synods cover one or more entire provinces, whereas some ELCA synods cover the whole or part of a metro area and some cover several states. Like the ELCA a presiding bishop serves as its head, but in the ELCIC, this bishop is known as the "National Bishop". Although episcopal in structure, the church does not have cathedrals as such, though the largest parish church in a city may well have that de facto function with respect to major worship services involving the whole Lutheran community.

National Bishops

The Rev. Donald Sjoberg, 1986–1993
The Rev. Telmor Sartison, 1993–2001
The Rev. Raymond Schultz, 2001–2007
The Rev. Canon Susan Johnson, 2007-

Same-sex unions

In 2006, the Eastern Synod voted to allow individual pastors and congregations to conduct blessing of same-sex unions, prompting a dispute between the synod and the national church over which body has the authority to make such a decision. The national church had previously voted against blessings, and the ELCIC's full communion partner, the Anglican Church of Canada, had voted to defer a decision. On June 23, 2007, at its National Convention, the ELCIC voted, by a 200–181 vote margin, against authorizing the Synods to devise individual mission strategies in regard to ministering to people who live in committed same-sex relationships, including the possibility of blessing such unions. The Eastern Synod Council, while affirming its jurisdiction in the matter, agreed to hold its decision in abeyance pending a decision by the national church.
 
In July 2011, the National Convention of the ELCIC adopted a new social statement on human sexuality and approved a motion allowing pastors whose conscience permits, in consultation with their congregations, to preside at marriages for same-gender couples. Some have claimed that the adoption of "ELCIC Social Statement on Human Sexuality" openly violates Article 2 of the ELCIC constitution, and have challenged the adoption as a violation of the ELCIC's constitution. A challenge was placed before the ELCIC's Court of Adjudication. The Court found that the complainant did not have the status required by the Constitution to press the complaint and declined to hear the complaint. As a result of the 2011 vote and the court's decision, the ELCIC today permits the blessing of same-sex unions and the ordination of openly gay or lesbian pastors.

References

External links
 

Lutheran World Federation members
Lutheranism in Canada
Lutheran denominations in North America
Members of the World Council of Churches
Christian organizations established in 1986
1986 establishments in Canada